Linda semivittata is a species of beetle in the family Cerambycidae. It was described by Léon Fairmaire in 1887. It is known from China.

References

semivittata
Beetles described in 1887